Geir Digerud (born 19 May 1956) is a Norwegian cyclist.

He was born in Oslo, and is the son of Per Digerud. He competed at the 1976 Summer Olympics in Montreal, where he placed 55th in the road race and eighth in team time trial with the Norwegian team. He won a bronze medal in team time trial at the 1979 UCI Road World Championships.

He won the Norwegian National Road Race Championship in 1977, 1978 and 1979, and represented the clubs Birkenes IL and SK Rye.

References

1956 births
Living people
Cyclists from Oslo
Norwegian male cyclists
Olympic cyclists of Norway
Cyclists at the 1976 Summer Olympics